Granulicoccus phenolivorans is a Gram-positive and phenol-degrading bacterium which has been isolated from phenolic wastewater in Singapore.

References 

Propionibacteriales
Bacteria described in 2007
Monotypic bacteria genera